Aethesoides is a genus of moths belonging to the subfamily Tortricinae of the family Tortricidae.

Species
Aethesoides allodapa Razowski, 1986
Aethesoides chalcospila (Meyrick, 1932)
Aethesoides columbiana Razowski, 1967
Aethesoides distigmatana (Walsingham, 1897)
Aethesoides enclitica (Meyrick, 1917)
Aethesoides hondurasica Razowski, 1986
Aethesoides inanita Razowski & Becker, 1986
Aethesoides mexicana Razowski, 1986
Aethesoides stellans Razowski & Becker, 1994
Aethesoides timia Razowski & Becker, 1986

See also
List of Tortricidae genera

References

 , 2005: World catalogue of insects volume 5 Tortricidae.
 , 1964, Ann. Zool. 22: 357
 , 1986: List of Neotropical Aethes Billb. and Aethesoides Raz. (Lepidoptera, Tortricidae), with descriptions of new species. Annales Zoologici, Polska Akademia Nauk. 40(7): 387–396.
 , 2011: Diagnoses and remarks on genera of Tortricidae, 2: Cochylini (Lepidoptera: Tortricidae). Shilap Revista de Lepidopterologia 39 (156): 397–414.

External links

tortricidae.com

Cochylini
Tortricidae genera